Kaya Magan Cissé or Kaya Maghan(meaning ruler of gold) also known as Dinga Cisse(c. 700) was a Soninke king of Wagadou(Ouagadou). He was the founder of the Cissé Tounkara dynasty which later dominated the Ghana Empire from the 8th century CE.

References

Soninke people
Ghana Empire
8th-century monarchs in Africa
African kings